The Prospector is a rural passenger train service in Western Australia operated by Transwa between East Perth and Kalgoorlie. On this service, two trains depart almost at the same time in opposite directions, one travelling between East Perth and Kalgoorlie, and the other between Kalgoorlie and East Perth. The original vehicles ordered in 1968 for trains providing this service were replaced in 2004 with vehicles capable of reducing journey times to 6 hours 45 minutes.

History

With the standard gauge line from Perth to Kalgoorlie due to open in mid-1969, the Western Australian Government Railways decided to replace The Kalgoorlie overnight sleeper service with a daylight service. The new service commenced on 29 November 1971, cutting the  journey time from fourteen to eight hours.

Stops
East Perth
Midland
Toodyay
Northam
Meckering
Cunderdin
Tammin
Kellerberrin
Doodlakine
Hines Hill
Merredin
Burracoppin
Carrabin
Bodallin
Moorine Rock
Southern Cross
Koolyanobbing
Bonnie Vale
Kalgoorlie

Services
There is one train each way daily between East Perth and Kalgoorlie. On Mondays and Fridays there are two services each way.

Onboard facilities
Each seat on board is in the same class. At every seat there is a touchscreen entertainment system with a small selection of movies, TV shows and music. They also offer a tray table, in-seat power (Australian type only), and a foot rest.

Food is not complimentary on board and can be bought at the buffet. The buffet offers a variety of items such as ham and cheese croissants, pies, muffins, soft drinks, potato chips, lollies and alcohol.

Rolling stock
In 1968, Comeng, Granville were awarded a contract to build eight WAGR WCA/WCE class railcars.

Built to take advantage of the generous loading gauge on the new line, they were the largest carriages ever built in Australia. They were the first trains in Australia to have at-seat catering. These held the record for the highest speed attained by an Australian train until bettered by a New South Wales XPT in September 1981.

In December 2000, Westrail awarded a contract to United Goninan, Broadmeadow for seven Transwa WDA/WDB/WDC class railcars to replace the original railcars.

The first entered service on 28 June 2004. Nonetheless, they further reduced journey times to 6 hours 45 minutes.

Ridership
The Prospector had 68,497 passengers in the year leading up to June 2022.

See also
 AvonLink
 Australind (train service)
 MerredinLink

References

Bibliography
100th anniversary of rail link (History of the Eastern Goldfields railway, officially completed on 1 January 1897, to the present, including introduction of the Prospector train on 29 November 1971) Kalgoorlie Miner 1 January 1997, p. 2

External links

Perth Trains gallery

Named passenger trains of Western Australia
Prospector rail service
Railway services introduced in 1971
1971 establishments in Australia